Sir Mike Mbama Okiro  was the Inspector General of the Nigeria Police Force from 2007 to 2009.

Background
Mike Okiro was born on 24 July 1949 in Oguta, Imo State and hails from Egbema in Ogba/Egbema/Ndoni Local Government Area of Rivers State. He is the Agunechemba I of Egbema, and Nigeria's first ethnic Igbo to assume the post of Police Inspector General.
He holds a degree in English Language from the University of Ibadan, a Masters of Public Administration from the University of Lagos and an LLB and LLM from the University of Jos. He, in addition, also holds Honorary Doctorate Degrees from the Federal University of Technology, Owerri, Imo State and Novena University, Delta State. He is an Alumnus of the prestigious National Institute of Policy and Strategic Studies (NIPSS), Kuru Plateau State.

Career
He joined the Nigerian Police in 1977. Operational and command positions include serving as DPO in several police stations, Member, Armed Robbery & Firearms Tribunal, Lagos State, Assistant & Deputy Commissioner of Police (operations), Lagos State and later Benue State. He received a double promotion from Commissioner of Police when he became Deputy Inspector-General of Police.
In June 2009, Okiro released a book titled "Policing Nigeria in a Democracy".

On assumption of office as the Inspector-General of Police, he worked to provide secure environment for the actualization of the President’s vision of placing Nigeria among the world's top 20 economies by the year 2020. He created a channel of communication as a tool of bridging the Police-Public divide; the philosophy that gave birth to THE DAWN newspaper. He reinstated a number of officers who had been forced into early retirement and also made police service more open, receptive and responsive to troubled spots in the country the results of which all Nigerians are living witnesses and promised to provide improved pay, housing and equipment to the police. In October 2008, Okiro spoke on the responsibilities of the press, saying reporters should avoid sensationalism and should investigate any story carefully before reporting it. In February 2009 he stated that banks neglected security in their branches because they had insurance coverage.

In November 2008 and again in February 2009, the Chairman of the House Committee on Police Affairs, Abdul Ahmed Ningi, asked Kiro to provide details of the money recovered from the former Inspector-General of Police Tafa Balogun, a request that he passed on to the Economic and Financial Crimes Commission (EFCC) Chairman, Farida Waziri. The EFCC stated that they did not have records of the exact properties recovered from Balogun. 

In April 2009, Ayoke Adebayo, Resident Electoral Commissioner of Ekiti State, wrote a letter to President Umaru Musa Yar'Adua resigning from the Independent National Electoral Commission (INEC) saying she would not yield to pressure to change election results in her state.  Mike Mbama Okiro declared that she must make herself available to the Nigeria Police within 24hours.

Okiro headed a five-man inter-agency panel to investigate the $190 million Halliburton scandal in which it was alleged that KBR, a subsidiary of Halliburton, had distributed bribes to politicians and officials to gain construction contracts from Nigeria Liquefied Natural Gas.  In July 2009 it was found that a key suspect, Abdulakadir Abacha, cousin of former military ruler General Sani Abacha, might have fled the country.  President Yar’Adua ordered an interim report to ensure that the panel was not compromised or influenced during a planned visit abroad.  Although Abdulkadir Abacha was never caught, President Yar’Adua congratulated Okiro on his retirement at age 60 in July 2009, for his achievements while in the IGP Office.

On May 22, 2015, Aaron Kaase, a Principal Admin Officer (Press and Public Relations) of the Police Service Commission complained to the Economic and Financial Crimes Commission (EFCC), as well as the Independent Corrupt Practices and Related Offences Commission (ICPC), detailing acts of corruption against Okiro, in which he allegedly swindled the Police Service Commission of over N275 million.  The ICPC investigated and cleared Okiro of all criminal infractions.

Post-retirement
He retired on 24 July 2009 from the Nigeria Police Force meritoriously, having attained the mandatory retirement age of 60 years. The entire Nigeria Police Force will continue to eulogize, appreciate and give ample reasons to remember him for all that he enacted, stood for, and his inherent principles of being celebrated but yet a benevolent tough cop.

Speaking in August 2009 after a farewell parade in his honour in Abuja, Okiro spoke of problems with the system where the IGP does not have the authority to fulfill his responsibilities. He also said "The unkindest cut is the attack of a public officer after he has left office with the unholy belief that he is no longer in a position to defend himself."

Okiro is married with children and enjoys playing chess and writing in his spare time.

Literary works
Okiro has authored five five books of different genres:
Peace and the Nation;
Surviving the Cities;
The Legal implications of the Mismanagement of Public Funds in Nigeria;
Policing Nigeria in a Democracy
Overcoming Security Challenges

Appointed by President Jonathan as Chairman of The Police Service Commission
On May 8, 2013, President Goodluck Jonathan nominated Okiro as the chairman of the Police Service Commission. Senate President David Mark confirmed Okiro's appointment after a senate confirmation hearing.

References

Nigerian police officers
Law enforcement in Nigeria
Living people
1949 births
People from Imo State
University of Ibadan alumni
Igbo people
University of Lagos alumni
University of Jos alumni